KNJO may refer to:

 the ICAO code for Millinocket Municipal Airport in Millinocket, Maine, United States
 KNJO-LP, a low-power television station (channel 6) licensed to Holbrook, Arizona, United States
 KYRA (FM), an FM radio station in Thousand Oaks, California, that formerly used the call sign KNJO